Sharon Dorson (born 9 March 1994) is a Congolese handball player for Le Havre AC and the Congolese national team.

She participated at the 2021 World Women's Handball Championship in Spain.

References

1994 births
Living people
Congolese female handball players